The Rosenberg Railroad Museum is a non-profit organization located at 1921 Avenue F, Rosenberg, Texas and maintains exhibits relating to local railroad history.

References

External links

 Rosenberg Railroad Museum home page

Railroad museums in Texas
Museums in Fort Bend County, Texas
Rosenberg, Texas